Hermann Edward Hasse (12 January 1836 – 29 October 1915) was an American lichenologist. He wrote two important texts and numerous articles in his field. 
Hassea, which is a genus of fungi in the class Dothideomycetes, and Lecidea hassei, a lichen that grows inside solid rock (endolithic lichen), were both named in his honor. He principally did his research in southern California. His correspondents included cryptogamic botanist William Gilson Farlow and lichenologist George Knox Merrill.

Publications

In 1913, Hasse published The Lichen Flora Of Southern California, a flora of the lichens of southern California covering about 400 taxa. Lichenologist Kerry Knudsen described it as "historic" in the lichenology journal Opuscula Philolichenum., written by Hermann Edward Hasse. He also wrote the earlier Lichens of Southern California, published in 1898, and 30 other papers and notes on lichens, many published in The Bryologist.

References

External sources
Letters, Archives of the Farlow Herbarium of Cryptogamic Botany

1836 births
1915 deaths
American lichenologists